This summarises various goal statistics of the Germany national football team.

Youngest goalscorers 
19 youngest goalscorers were younger than 20 years, 38 still underage at their first goal. Lukas Podolski is the youngest player to score two goals in one match, but only in his eighth match. By contrast, Fritz Walter in his first international match as the youngest player yet three goals. Josef Gauchel is the youngest player to score his first goal in a competitive fixture, in the OG 1936 1st Round, all other of the 20 youngest goalscorers scored in friendly matches. The youngest competitive goal scorer is Mario Götze, who scored his second goal at the age of 19 years and 91 days on 2 September 2011 in the EC 2012 Qualification against Austria. The following table lists all national players who have not reached the age of 20 years.

Oldest goalscorers 
17 players were over 33 in their last goal, including record goal scorer Miroslav Klose, who also scored the most goals after his 30th birthday. His precursor Gerd Müller scored his last of 68 international goals with 28 years and 246 days, making him the player with the most goals before the 30th Birthday. Klose was 35 years and 362 days old at his 69th international goal, with whom he replaced Müller as the record scorer. Müller was at his 44th international goal, with whom he substituted Uwe Seeler as a record holder 26 years and 205 days old. In turn, he was 29 years and 230 days old when he scored his 34th goal Fritz Walter, who had become 16 days after his 35th birthday record goalscorer, but was unable to play internationals for 8.5 years. The following table lists all national players who have reached the age of 33.

Scorers with at least three goals in a match 

50 players score at least three goals in at least one match, 16 of them in at least two matches. Only six players scored in this in their first match. Otto Dumke was the only of them get no further goals. Two other players also scored only these goals, including Julius Hirsch after all four in one match. For four players it was the first goals, but they had previously played a match without scoring. Two players scored only three goals in their last match, for Paul Pömpner it was the only goal.

Most often, three goals of a player in matches against Finland (even two players) and against Switzerland (seven times). In seven matches two players could score at least three goals. In friendly match the most common (50 times) was to score at least three goals by one player. Gerd Müller is the only player who scored three goals in two consecutive matches: On 7 and 10 June 1970, he scored in the World Cup matches against Bulgaria and Peru three goals each. The two matches on 18 and 26 April 1926, in which initially Josef Pöttinger and then Otto Harder scored three goals, followed immediately after each other. Richard Hofmann is the only player who has succeeded in three consecutive years (1928-1932) in each match a "hat-trick". For Miroslav Klose, the longest time (six years and three months) passed between two "hat-trick". In the 1950s, 1980s and 1990s, there was no match in which a player scored at least four goals. matches with at least three goals of a player, however, existed in every decade with the exception of the years before 1910. In twelve matches, the shooters of three goals were the only German scorer, also succeeded once Gerd Müller, at the inauguration of Munich Olympiastadions to score four goals without another German player scoring. In two matches, there were only the two "hat-trick" by two players, both matches ended 6–0. No match in which a player could score at least three goals was lost, but five ended in a draw (3 × 3:3, 1 × 4:4 and 5:5 respectively). The strongest opponent, against whom a player scored a "hat-trick", were the Switzerland 1925 (silver medalist of the Olympic Games 1924), Yugoslavia in 1962 and in the European Semifinals 1976 (World Cup Fourth of 1962 and European Championship Fourth in 1976), the Soviet Union in 1972 (defeated by Germany four weeks later in the European Championship finals), the Netherlands in 1980 (Vice World Champion of 1978) and the FIFA World Ranking fourth Portugal at the 2014 World Cup.

Scorers who have scored at least 3 goals in more than one match 
For several players with the same number of match, the entry is made chronologically.

The best Quota 

More than an average of one goal per match made at least three matches completed only ten players. Gottfried Fuchs was the only player to score more than 2 goals per match.

Chronological list of players who scored in the 1st minute of match 
The German team scored the least of their goals in the first and third minute of the match. Only eleven times a goal could be scored shortly after the kick-off. Lukas Podolski, who scored the goal after nine seconds, although the opponent was offensive, scored the last and fastest. Overall, only 65 German goals scored in the first five minutes of match. The fastest opponent scorer - so far known - was the Belgian Hendrik Isemborghs, who scored the 1: 0 for Belgium on 28 April 1935 after 35 seconds, but still lost with 1: 6.

Chronological list of players who scored in the last minute of the match 
In the 90th minute, including additional time scored 61 goals according to DFB statistics with most matches of all minutes. In addition, one goal was scored in the 95th minute in an extra time, which ended the match (Golden Goal) and one goal in the 120th minute. This is followed by the 72nd with 35, the 65th, 70th, 85th and 88th with 32 hits each. In the 85th minute were also the winning goals in the World Cup victories in 1954 and 1990, but also the goal that made Argentina 1986 World Cup. Most of the goals came in the 90th minute including additional time.

In most cases, the goals in the final minute were no longer competitive match. Ten goals but still brought the victory, nine goals prevented a defeat. Two goals (Nr. 4 and 7) scored for an extra time, in which Germany nevertheless lost. One (Nr.8) scored an extra-time, scoreless, after which Germany lost on penalty shoot-out. Oliver Neuville scored the most goals (4) in the final minute, with two even scoring in a match. In each of the three matches he had been substituted. Lukas Podolski is the first player to do so in two consecutive matches. In both he secured Germany a draw. Mesut Özil scored the first goal in the last minute of an extra time against Algeria in the World Cup 2014 Round of 16.

Owngoals of the German team 
So far, 27 owngoals have been scored for the opposing teams as owngoal s German players. Already in the first international match Ernst Jordan scored an own goal. Two own goals scored Arne Friedrich and Thomas Helmer, four times the captains scored the own goal. Only once was the owngoal the only goal of the match and thus competitive match. In three matches (April 2, 1958, October 11, 1995 and June 6, 2007) also an opponent scored an owngoal.

Chronological list of players who have scored in one match a goal of the month 
So far, began in 1971 by the ARD - Sportschau election of the goal of month and 53 goals in matches of the German national team scored excellent in about 9% of the matches played since 1971 are Goal of the month. In addition Benjamin Lauth succeeded on 16 December 2002 in the match of the national team in a charity match against a Bundesliga Allstar team a goal of the month. 37 players have been honored at least once as national team, three of them (Günter Netzer, Marco Bode and Miroslav Klose) as players only for a together with another player or each other. Most (3 each) achieved Michael Ballack, Klaus Fischer, Lukas Podolski and Rudi Völler. For every 4 players, the goal of the month was the only, first or last goal in the national team. For Uwe Bein, Marco Bode, Heinz Flohe, Mario Gomez, Leon Goretzka Mario Gotze, Dietmar Hamann, Jens Jeremies , Miroslav Klose, Toni Kroos, Philipp Lahm, Dieter Müller, Hansi Müller, Christian Pander, Stefan Reuter, Piotr Trochowski, Berti Vogts and Herbert Wimmer was the award for goal, the only goal of the month. Uli Hoeneß also scored one goal of the month for the Olympics, but none as a club player.

The most often (25 times) it was the 1–0, six times the decisive 1–0. Two goals, the Golden Goal Oliver Bierhoff and the 1: 0 by Mario Götze were decisive for a title win. The most frequently scored (4 times) the goal of the month against Wales.

A goal of the month in a match against Germany Hans Krankl scored for the Austria in World Cup 1978 Group (2:3).

One goal of the month was also achieved by Klaus Fischer, Benjamin Lauth and Uwe Seeler in charity matches of the national team and a match by former was selected for the goal of the year.

In 1976, in three consecutive months (April, May and June) the goal of the month was scored by a national player. In 1994, Jürgen Klinsmann scored two goals of the month within five goals as a player.

List of players who scored goals after substituted (g.a.s) 

The following list contains the players who scored at least four goals after a substitution. First player who scored a goal after a substitution was Richard Hanke on November 2, 1930 in the match against Norway. He had come on as a substitute for the second half and scored in the 55th minute 1-0 (final score 1:1), at a time when substitutes were rarely practiced. It was his only use in the national team and thus his only goal. In total, 79 players scored 165 goals after substitutions, 21 of them scored only goals after substitutions, including Max Kruse with four, Olaf Marschall with three and Andreas Thom and Patrick Helmes with two goals each. Thom had previously scored 16 goals for East Germany. For 46 players, the goal after a substitute their first international goal, Dieter Müller get three, Thomas Hitzlsperger, Erich Beer and Ronald Worm two goals each. For Dieter Müller it was also the first international match and the gates led first to equalize in EC 1976 Semi final and then to victory. Worm also scored his first two goals in his first international match. The final after substitution goal was scored by Lars Stindl in the 2–2 draw against France on 14 November 2017, ten minutes after his substitution in the third minute of additional time. With 41 substitutions, Lukas Podolski is the most-substituted player. The most successful scorer in world championships is André Schürrle with three goals (2014) in front of Rudi Völler, who scored two goals in 1986 after substitutions. Best scorer at European Championships was Dieter Müller with three goals ahead of Oliver Bierhoff, who scored two goals in 1996 after substitution. Both scored their goal after substitution in one match.

Penalty

Penalty from the match 

So far (as of November 13, 2021) were given 126 penalties for Germany in 130 matches. Of these, 104 were converted (80%). The first penalty was in the second match of the German team for 1:1 (final score 1: 5). In two matches, there were two penalties for Germany, in two cases both penalties by one player (Fritz Walter World Cup 1954 semi-final and Bastian Schweinsteiger) were converted. Once two players (Torsten Frings and Lukas Podolski were successful iat the same match and once both shooters could not take advantage of it at the same match.

The most common was Michael Ballack for the penalty kick that convert ten of eleven penalties. The most misses recorded Jürgen Klinsmann, who could not convert three of six penalties. 28 penalties were converted by captain (c), most often (7 times) Lothar Matthäus convert as captain.

Penalties were given most often against Bulgaria: 9 in a total of 21 matches, 42% of matches against Bulgaria, of which 8 were converted. Six penalties were given the German team against a reigning world champion, who were all transformed. Thirteen penalties Germany were given as reigning world champion, of which ten could be converted.

In 15 matches, the conversion of the penalty was decisive to the match, where it came four times by the converted penalty after deficit still in a draw and once followed by another penalty. In 36 matches, the converted penalty was the first goal, including in May 1963 the first goal in the first match against world champions Brazil. The opponents managed to draw three times and win the match five times. In seven matches, the converted penalty was the only goal.

Special penalties was the penalty converted by Andreas Brehme in the 1990 World Cup final, which was for the intended penalty taker Lothar Matthäus. This made Germany the first team to be given a penalty in two World Cup finals after Germany became the first team in 1974 to be penalized in a FIFA World Cup final. Even in the quarter-finals of the 1990 World Cup, the converted penalty was the only goal of the match.

51 penalties were converted in friendly matches, 18 in European Championship qualifiers, 11 in World Cup qualifiers and 10 in World Cup matches.

21 players are in the match reports called the DFB, who could not turn a penalty in 26 matches. For Franz Beckenbauer, Albert Brülls, Jürgen Grabowski, Horst-Dieter Höttges, Hans Kalb, Werner Krämer , Pierre Littbarski, Josef Lüke and Andreas Möller were the only penalties for the national team. However, all the shooters except Josef Lüke were able to score at least one international goal. Only in one case, after a goalkeeper-kept penalty another player could score the defended ball in goal. The most failed attempts had Jürgen Klinsmann, Max Breunig, Pierre Littbarski and Gerd Müller, who each had two misses.

The following table lists all players who competed in the penalty shoot-out.

Penalty shoot-out 

The German national team has had eight matches go to penalty shootouts; the team won six of them and lost two. Germany (4) and Argentina (5) are the only teams to have won a shootout four or more times each in a World Cup; Germany is thus the only team ever to have had more than one penalty shootout at a World Cup with a 100% win rate. Argentina suffered their only defeat in a penalty shootout at a World Cup against Germany. The most successful German shooters are Andreas Brehme, Pierre Littbarski, Lothar Matthäus and Olaf Thon, with two penalties each, though Lothar Matthäus does not have a perfect record. Harald Schumacher is the most successful goalkeeper with four penalties. Sepp Maier (1976) and Eike Immel (1988) are the only goalkeepers who could not hold a penalty in a penalty shoot-out. There have been four times when all German penalty takers were successful; in three cases, only four German shooters had to compete because the decision had already been made before the fifth. Even with the two lost penalties the fifth shooter did not have to compete because the decision had already been made. In two cases (1982 and 1996) the additional sixth German shooter scored the victory, in 2016 only the ninth shooter (Jonas Hector).

Notes

References 

Germany national football team results
Goals
Germany national football team records and statistics
Association football player non-biographical articles